HC Dobrudja is a men's handball club from Dobrich, Bulgaria, that plays in the GHR A, the highest level handball league in Bulgaria.

European record

Team

Current squad 
Squad for the 2016–17 season

Goalkeepers
 Emil Ivanov
 Nikolay Kostadinov 
 Ivaylo Kostov

Wingers
RW
  Aleksandar Dimitrov 
  Stefan Eftimov
  Stiliyan Stoyanov
LW 
  Georgi Mihaylov
  Mihail Neychev
  Miroslav Simeonov
Line players 
  Ilyan Denev
  Donislav Dimitrov

Back players
LB
  Iliyan Iliev 
  Krasimir Koev
  Marin Sarandev
  Dzhoshkun Yakubov
CB 
  Yordan Mihailov
  Yavor Nikolov 
  Anton Petrov 
RB
  Krasen Kraychev
  Svetoslav Nedev
  Zlatan Petrov

External links
Official website

References

HC Dobrudja
Dobrich